Jelle van Kruijssen (born 3 July 1989) is a Dutch footballer who plays as a striker for Londerzeel.

Playing career
Van Kruijssen spent his youth at amateur sides, UNA and DVS, but transferred to the Willem II youth team as a teenager. He did not break through to the first team, resulting in a transfer to FC Eindhoven together with fellow Willem II player, Ratko Vansimpsen. Van Kruijssen made his first team debut on 27 August 2010, replacing Vansimpsen 83 minutes into a 3–0 victory over Fortuna Sittard at Jan Louwers Stadion.

In 2013, van Kruijssen was sent on a summer loan to the USL Premier Development League team, Houston Dutch Lions. He made his debut on 11 May 2013 against Laredo Heat where he scored. After this he would no longer get a professional contract and played in Belgium for Zwarte Leeuw, Hoogstraten VV and Berchem Sport. He moved to Londerzeel ahead of the 2020–21 season.

References

External links
VI Profile

1989 births
Living people
Footballers from Eindhoven
Dutch footballers
Association football forwards
FC Eindhoven players
Eerste Divisie players
K. Berchem Sport players
VV UNA players
Willem II (football club) players
Houston Dutch Lions players
Dutch expatriate footballers
Expatriate soccer players in the United States
Expatriate footballers in Belgium
Dutch expatriate sportspeople in the United States
Dutch expatriate sportspeople in Belgium
USL League Two players
Belgian Third Division players
Challenger Pro League players
Hoogstraten VV players